The 46th New Brunswick Legislative Assembly represented New Brunswick between February 27, 1968, and September 3, 1970.

Wallace Samuel Bird was Lieutenant-Governor of New Brunswick.

Robert B. McCready was chosen as speaker.

The Liberal Party led by Louis Robichaud formed the government.

History

Members 

Notes:

References 
 Canadian Parliamentary Guide, 1970, PG Normandin

Terms of the New Brunswick Legislature
1967 establishments in New Brunswick
1970 disestablishments in New Brunswick
20th century in New Brunswick